Pencil beam scanning is the practice of steering a beam of radiation or charged particles across an object. It is often used in proton therapy, to reduce unnecessary radiation exposure to surrounding non-cancerous cells.

Ionizing radiation

Ionizing radiation photons or x-rays (IMRT) use pencil beam scanning to precisely target a tumor. Photon pencil beam scans are defined as crossing of two beams to a fine point.

Charged particles
 
Several charged particles devices used with Proton therapy cancer centers use pencil beam scanning. The newer proton therapy machines use a pencil beam scanning technology.
This technique is also called spot scanning. The Paul Scherrer Institute was the developer of spot beam.

Intensity Modulated Proton Therapy

Varian's IMPT system uses all pencil-beam controlled protons where the beam intensity can also be controlled at this small level. This can be done by going back and forth over a previously radiated area during the same radiation session.

See also

Pencil (mathematics)
Pencil (optics)
Radiation treatment planning
mean free path
Monte Carlo method for photon transport
Hybrid theory for photon transport in tissue
Diffusion theory
Monte Carlo method
Varian Medical Systems

References

Medical physics
Radiobiology
Radiation therapy